Myungnang manhwa (명랑만화) is a Korean term which literally means "bright" (명랑 myeongnang) manhwa, or comics. They are typically directed towards children or all ages. They use sketched drawings and humor to evoke laughter and usually deal with positive/cheerful themes. This term was used since the 1960s. Similarly, Japan has children's manga.

References

Manhwa
South Korean children's entertainment